The 1949 Little League World Series was held from August 24 to August 27 in Williamsport, Pennsylvania. The Hammonton All Stars of Hammonton, New Jersey, defeated the Pensacola All Stars of Pensacola, Florida, in the championship game of the 3rd Little League World Series.

This was the first tournament to be called the "Little League World Series". Attendees at the championship game included Ford Frick, president of the National League (and later Commissioner of Baseball).

Teams

Bracket

References

External links
 1949 Tournament Bracket via Wayback Machine
 1949 Line Scores via Wayback Machine

Little League World Series
Little League World Series
Little League World Series